Nixon Dias (born 2 September 1979 in Rotterdam) is a Dutch retired footballer who made his Eredivisie league debut with club Sparta Rotterdam during the 1996-1997 season.

Club career
Dias also played for club ADO Den Haag during the 2000-2001 season. After several seasons with amateur clubs in the Rotterdam area, Dias joined United Soccer League club Dayton Dutch Lions in February 2012.

He retired at amateur club Zwarte Pijl and became youth coach at VOC Rotterdam in 2016.

References

External links
Profile of Dayton Dutch Lions official website

1979 births
Living people
Footballers from Rotterdam
Dutch sportspeople of Cape Verdean descent
Association football defenders
Dutch footballers
Sparta Rotterdam players
ADO Den Haag players
Dayton Dutch Lions players
Eredivisie players
Eerste Divisie players
Dutch expatriate footballers
Dutch expatriate sportspeople in the United States
Expatriate soccer players in the United States
USL Championship players
ASWH players
VV Zwaluwen players